Mark McCormack (born 30 December 1974) is an Irish former footballer.

He joined Shamrock Rovers from Stella Maris in 1993 and made his debut on 3 April 1994 as Rovers sealed their 15th League Championship .

He made one appearance for the Hoops in the UEFA Cup in 1994.

Currently, he is the Under 8 A and Nursery Coach for Corduff F.C. His first cousin is Mick Lawlor (footballer).

Honours

SRFC Young Player of the Year:
 Shamrock Rovers – 1994/95

References

Republic of Ireland association footballers
Shamrock Rovers F.C. players
League of Ireland players
1972 births
Living people
Stella Maris F.C. players
Association footballers not categorized by position